Cibolacris is a genus of slant-faced grasshoppers in the family Acrididae. There are at least four described species in Cibolacris.

Species
These four species belong to the genus Cibolacris:
 Cibolacris crypticus (Vickery, 1969)
 Cibolacris parviceps (F. Walker, 1870) (cream grasshopper)
 Cibolacris samalayucae Tinkham, 1961 (samalayuca dune grasshopper)
 Cibolacris weissmani Otte, 1981

References

Further reading

External links

 

Acrididae
Articles created by Qbugbot